James Thomas Broyhill (August 19, 1927 – February 18, 2023) was an American businessman and politician who served as a Republican U.S. Representative and Senator from the state of North Carolina. He represented much of the Foothills region of the state in the House from 1963 to 1986, and served in the United States Senate for four months in 1986.

Biography
Broyhill was born in Lenoir, North Carolina, the youngest son of Satie Hunt and North Carolina furniture magnate James Edgar Broyhill. The senior Broyhill was a member of the Republican National Committee for 28 years. However, for most of that time the party was almost nonexistent in the former Confederacy, including North Carolina. After attending the University of North Carolina at Chapel Hill, Jim Broyhill joined his father's company in 1945 and served in various capacities there until 1962. He was also active in several state industry associations, as well as a civic leader in Lenoir.

Congress 
Broyhill believed there needed to be a more competitive election landscape in North Carolina, and that he could play a role in strengthening the Republican party by running for office himself.

Broyhill made his first run for elected office in 1962 for North Carolina's 9th Congressional District.  Broyhill was the unexpected beneficiary of redistricting after the 1960 census, which cost North Carolina a congressional district. The Democratic-controlled General Assembly saw a chance to get rid of the then lone Republican in the congressional delegation, Charles Raper Jonas of the Charlotte area, by re-drawing his district from under him. In the process, they shifted some strongly Republican areas into the 9th, a district where growing Republican influence had kept five-term Democrat Hugh Quincy Alexander from establishing a foothold. At the same time, they shifted some strongly Democratic areas of the 9th into the new 8th District designed to defeat Jonas. However, the plan backfired disastrously when Jonas handily defeated 8th District incumbent A. Paul Kitchin and Broyhill defeated Alexander by just under one percentage point in an upset.

Broyhill never faced another contest nearly that close again.  Due to his very conservative stances on nearly all issues and an emphasis on taking good care of his constituents (most of whom had never been represented by a Republican before), he became very popular in his district. He won reelection by 11 points in the midst of the gigantic Democratic landslide of 1964, in which Lyndon B. Johnson carried 87 of North Carolina's 100 counties. Broyhill won reelection 10 times thereafter, never receiving less than 54 percent of the vote and only winning by less than 10 points twice in what became the most Republican district in North Carolina. His district was renumbered the 10th in 1969.

A highlight of his long service in the House was his leadership role in creating the Consumer Product Safety Commission.

U.S. Senate 
On June 29, 1986, Senator John P. East, who was not seeking re-election, committed suicide. Broyhill already had won the Republican nomination for the race to succeed East, and Governor Jim Martin appointed Broyhill to the seat for the remainder of the term. The plan was to give Broyhill an incumbency advantage over the Democratic nominee, former Governor Terry Sanford. However, Sanford narrowly defeated Broyhill in November and took office immediately.

Later career 
Broyhill later served as chairman of the North Carolina Economic Development Commission and then as the state's Secretary of Commerce.

He retired from politics in 1991 but was appointed to the board of trustees of Appalachian State University two years later.

Broyhill was inducted into the North Carolina Republican Party Hall of Fame and the Lenoir, North Carolina Post Office was renamed in his honor. At the time of his death he resided in Winston-Salem with his wife, Louise Broyhill. He has a daughter, Marilyn Beach, and two sons, Ed and Phillip (died 2014). His daughter Marilyn and his son Ed also reside in Winston-Salem. He has six grandchildren; Elizabeth Broyhill Morris, James Broyhill, Penn Broyhill, Laura Beach Dugan, Lindsay Beach Grdina, and Ashley Beach Brooks. His son Ed was a candidate for the Republican nomination in the 5th Congressional District in 2004.

Death 
Broyhill died at a retirement home in Winston-Salem, North Carolina, on February 18, 2023, at the age of 95.

References

Works cited

External links

 

1927 births
2023 deaths
People from Lenoir, North Carolina
Politicians from Winston-Salem, North Carolina
University of North Carolina at Chapel Hill alumni
Republican Party United States senators from North Carolina
Republican Party members of the United States House of Representatives from North Carolina
Jesse Helms
State cabinet secretaries of North Carolina
Conservatism in the United States